

The Dragon Fly 333 is an ultralight utility helicopter developed by archaeologists and filmmakers Angelo and Alfredo Castiglioni in the 1990s. French UAV manufacturer CAC Systèmes created a drone version named the Héliot for use in reconnaissance and as an aerial target, but the aircraft did not enter production.

DF Helicopters was acquired in 2010 by a Swiss Group, Avio International Group.

Variants
 Dragon Fly 333 - initial version 
 Dragon Fly 333 AC - RAI-VLR certified version
 CAC Systèmes Héliot - drone version
 Dragon Fly 333 ULR - ultralight version

Specifications (333)

References

Bibliography

External links
 Manufacturer's website

1980s Italian civil utility aircraft
1980s Italian helicopters